Piamen or Piyamen may refer to:
 Piamen-e Olya
 Piamen-e Sofla